The 2020 Cork Senior A Football Championship was the inaugural staging of the Cork Senior A Football Championship since its establishment by the Cork County Board. The draw for the group stage placings took place on 19 November 2019. The championship was scheduled to begin in April 2020, however, it was postponed indefinitely due to the impact of the COVID-19 pandemic on Gaelic games. The championship eventually began on 24 July 2020 and, after being suspended once again on 5 October 2020, eventually concluded on 19 June 2021.

The final was played on 19 June 2021 at Páirc Uí Chaoimh in Cork, between Éire Óg and Mallow, in what was their second meeting in that year's championship but their first meeting in a final in any grade. Éire Óg won the match by 2-13 to 1-07 to claim their first championship title and their second successive promotion.

Éire Óg's Daniel Goulding was the championship's top scorer with 2-34.

Overview

Format

On 26 March 2019, three championship proposals were circulated to Cork club delegates after an expensive review process of the entire Cork championship system. A core element running through all three proposals, put together by the Cork GAA games workgroup, was that there be a group stage of 12 teams, as well as straight relegation and promotion. On 2 April 2019, a majority of 136 club delegates voted for Option A which provided for one round of games played in April and two more in August – all with inter-county players available.

Participating teams

Group A

Table

Results

Group B

Table

Results

Group C

Table

Results

Knockout stage

Relegation playoff

Quarter-finals

Semi-finals

Final

Championship statistics

Top scorers

Overall

In a single game

Miscellaneous

 Éire Óg are the first winners of the Senior A Championship.

References

External link

 Cork GAA website

Cork Senior A Football Championship
Cork
Cork Senior A
Cork Championship